Triuret is an organic compound with the formula (H2NC(O)NH)2CO.  It is a product from the pyrolysis of urea.  Triuret is a colorless, crystalline, hygroscopic solid, slightly soluble in cold water or ether, and more soluble in hot water.  It is a planar molecule. The central carbonyl is hydrogen-bonded to both terminal amino groups.

Synthesis
The compound is typically prepared by heating thin layers of urea, the thin layers facilitating escape of ammonia:
3 (H2N)2CO   →   [H2NC(O)NH]2CO  +  2 NH3
It can also prepared by treatment of urea with phosgene:  
2 (H2N)2CO  +  COCl2  →   [H2NC(O)NH]2CO  +  2 HCl
A similar synthesis employs urea and dimethyl carbonate with potassium methoxide as a catalyst:  
2 (H2N)2CO  +  CO(OCH3)2  →   [H2NC(O)NH]2CO  +  2 MeOH

The original synthesis entailed oxidation of uric acid with hydrogen peroxide.

Triuret is a complicating by-product in the industrial synthesis of melamine from urea.

Related compounds 
 Urea
 Biuret
 Cyanuric acid

References

Ureas
Functional groups